Uzhok Pass is a mountain pass in the north-eastern Carpathian Mountains in Ukraine through the Vodorazdel'nyy backbone.

It is located on the border of Stryi Raion (Lviv Oblast) and Velykyi Bereznyi Raion (Zakarpattia Oblast), on the watershed of San River and Uzh River. The pass is also close to the Poland-Ukraine border.

In World War I, the pass was the scene of fierce fighting between the advancing Russian Army and the defending Austro-Hungarian forces in the winter of 1914–1915.

Gallery

References
 Географическая энциклопедия Украины, УСЭ, 1989—1993 гг. ( in Russian . Ukrainian Geografical Encyclopedia, the part of Ukrainian Soviet Encyclopedia, 1989–1993 years)
 Географічна енциклопедія України: в 3-х томах / Редколегія: О. М. Маринич (відпов. ред.) та ін. — К.: «Українська радянська енциклопедія» імені М. П. Бажана, 1989.(in Ukrainian. Geografical Encyclopedia, the part of Ukrainian Soviet Encyclopedia, 1989–1993 years)

External links

 Uzhok and Uzhok pass. Castles and Temples of Ukraine.
 Uzhok Pass. "Mandrivka Ukrayinoyu".

Mountain passes of Ukraine
Mountain passes of the Carpathians
Poland–Ukraine border